West End is an inner suburb of Townsville in the City of Townsville, Queensland, Australia.

Geography 
West End is situated at the base of Castle Hill (the hill).

History 

The first community cemetery is located in West End. A reflection of attitudes existing during the time it was in use, research has established that it was ethnically segregated. It has been reported that there are separate areas where, at least, Chinese and Aboriginal deceased were interred.

During World War 2, the massive Green Street bunker was used by the RAAF. It is now the State Emergency Service building.

Townsville West State School opened on 21 March 1887 and celebrated its centenary in 1987.

St Mary's School opened on 1 October 1888.  In 1995, it was amalgamated into The Marian School in Currajong.

Townsville West Special School opened on 29 September 1958 and closed on 21 December 1992.

Townsville Flexible Learning Centre opened on 23 January 2006.

Education
Townsville West State School is a government primary (Prep-6) school for boys and girls at Wilson Street. In 2018, the school had an enrolment of 111 students with 13 teachers (8 full-time equivalent) and 11 non-teaching staff (6 full-time equivalent).

Townsville Flexible Learning Centre is a Catholic secondary (7-12) school for boys and girls at 26 Ingham Road. In 2018, the school had an enrolment of 134 students with 15 teachers (11 full-time equivalent) and 15 non-teaching staff (10 full-time equivalent).

Heritage listings

West End has a number of heritage-listed sites, including:
 5 Castling Street: Currajong (house)
 Francis Street: West End Cemetery
 Green Street: former RAAF Operations Building Site
 29 Ingham Road: Townsville West State School
 34 Ingham Road: St Mary's Church & Convent
 72-104 Ingham Road: Townsville Showground
 89 Ingham Road: West End Hotel
 95 Stagpole Street: Wolverton

References

External links
 University of Queensland: Queensland Places: West End (Townsville)

 
Suburbs of Townsville